Microdevario kubotai is a species of cyprinid found in southeast Asian rivers and streams. It belongs to the genus Microdevario, which contains small danionins. The type locality is in Ranong Province, Peninsular Thailand. It is also known from the adjacent Phang Nga Province and the Ataran basin in Myanmar. It likely occurs elsewhere in the region and an introduced population exists in the Songgaria River (part of the Khwae Noi basin).

In the aquarium fish trade, it is often identified as the "yellow neon" or "green neon" rasbora.

References

External links
 Microdevario kubotai

Fish described in 1999
Danios
Microdevario
Fish of Myanmar
Fish of Thailand